WUNR is a radio station serving the city of Boston, Massachusetts, licensed to nearby Brookline.  It broadcasts on 1600 kHz on the AM radio dial with an ethnic format.  It is owned by Herbert Hoffman.

History
The station first signed on in 1948 as WVOM, a local station.  WVOM was one of the earliest stations in the Boston area to adopt 24-hour broadcasting on a regular basis. The station was sold to Herbert Hoffman in 1955, who changed the call letters to WBOS and eventually added an FM station, WBOS-FM.

The AM station had some leased-time ethnic programming, but also for a time in the mid 1950s was home to one of the first rock-and-roll shows on Boston radio, hosted by a young Arnie "Woo-Woo" Ginsburg. In the late 1950s, WBOS was mostly a beautiful music simulcast on both AM and FM, although some ethnic programming remained on the AM side.

In the late 1960s, WBOS gradually abandoned simulcasting with WBOS-FM and increased the amount of ethnic programming on the AM side. The call letters of the AM station became WUNR in 1969 to reflect its ethnic format.

WUNR's transmitter and antenna are located in nearby Newton, Massachusetts. A few years back, the transmitter site was rebuilt, which resulted in a more powerful (20,000 watts) signal for the station in most of the Boston area, but still heavily "nulled" to the southwest to protect WWRL in New York City.

References

External links

UNR
Radio stations established in 1948
Brookline, Massachusetts
Mass media in Norfolk County, Massachusetts